E6, E06, E.VI or E-6 can mean:

Science, mathematics and engineering 

 The E6 series (number series) of preferred numbers for electronic components
 E6 (mathematics), a Lie group in mathematics
 E6 polytope in geometry
 E06, Thyroiditis ICD-10 code
 E-6 process, a common photographic process for developing transparency film
 E6 protein, a protein encoded by Human papillomavirus
 Honda E6, one of the predecessors of Honda's ASIMO robot

Transport 
 E-6 Mercury, a US Navy derivative of the Boeing 707
 E6 Series Shinkansen, a Japanese high-speed train
 BYD e6, an electric car by BYD Auto
 EMD E6, a diesel locomotive
 E6 European long distance path, a long-distance hiking trail
 Eggenfellner E6, an American aircraft engine design
 European route E6, a European highway route
 LB&SCR E6 class, a British steam locomotive
 LNER Class E6, a class of British steam locomotives
 London Buses route E6, a Transport for London contracted bus route
 Pfalz E.VI, a World War I German aircraft
 PRR E6, an American steam locomotive
 Jōban Expressway, Sendai-Tōbu Road, Sanriku Expressway (between Sendaiko-kita IC and Rifu JCT) and Sendai-Hokubu Road, the E6 expressway in Japan
 North–South Expressway Central Link, route E6 in Malaysia
 NAIA Expressway, route E6 in the Philippines

Other uses 
 Motorola ROKR E6, a 2006 multimedia phone model
 Nokia E6, a smartphone
 E6, a London postcode district in the E postcode area
 An error by the Shortstop in baseball
 E-6 (rank), the sixth rank of enlisted soldier in the US armed services
 The Elephant 6 Recording Company, a collective of independent American musicians
 Electric Six, a Detroit rock band
 E6, the first note of the whistle register
 The E6 grade of difficulty in rock climbing
 E6, a song by Norwegian band D.D.E. The song title is a reference to the European route E6.
 E6 (short for Epic 6), a variant of D&D 3.5